Stanislav Fischer (born 30 November 1936) is Czech astrophysicist and politician. He was Communist candidate for president in 1998 election.

Biography
FIscher was born in Ledce on 30 November 1936. He studied Atomic physics at Charles University and Moscow State University. His scientific work focuses on Cosmic ray. He became member of Communist party in 1957.

Fischer ran for Senate in 1996 but wasn't elected. Communist Party nominated him for president in 1998 Czech presidential election. Fischer received 31 electoral votes and came second but only Václav Havel advanced to the second round. He participated in subsequent 1998 Czech legislative election and became Member of Chamber of Deputies.

Fischer became candidate for 1999 Prague 1 by-election. Fischer received only 5.5% of votes and wasn't elected.

References

1936 births
Living people
People from Kladno District
Candidates in the 1998 Czech presidential election
Communist Party of Bohemia and Moravia MPs
Communist Party of Bohemia and Moravia presidential candidates
Members of the Chamber of Deputies of the Czech Republic (1998–2002)
Members of the Chamber of Deputies of the Czech Republic (2002–2006)
Charles University alumni